Pursuit is a 1935 American action film directed by Edwin L. Marin and written by Wells Root. The film stars Chester Morris, Sally Eilers, Scotty Beckett, Henry Travers, C. Henry Gordon and Dorothy Peterson. The film was released on August 9, 1935, by Metro-Goldwyn-Mayer.

Plot
Pilot Mitch Mitchell (Chester Morris) is asked to whisk a young child, Donny (Scotty Beckett), from California into Mexico by the youth's mother, who is involved in a nasty custody dispute with her sister. Mitch agrees to take on the job, but he must also take along Maxine (Sally Eilers), who works for an agency hired to bring the child back. She's agreed to help the boy escape, but the three must still avoid detection. Things come crashing to a head in Mexico.

Cast 
 Chester Morris as Mr. "Mitch" Mitchell
 Sally Eilers as Maxine Bush
 Scotty Beckett as Donald McCoy "Donny" Smith
 Henry Travers as Thomas "Tom" Reynolds
 C. Henry Gordon as Nick Shawn
 Dorothy Peterson as Mrs. McCoy
 Granville Bates as Auto Camp Proprietor
 Minor Watson as Hale
 Harold Huber as Jake
 Dewey Robinson as Jo-Jo
 Erville Alderson as Cop

References

External links 
 
 
 
 

1935 films
1930s English-language films
American action films
1930s action films
Metro-Goldwyn-Mayer films
Films directed by Edwin L. Marin
American black-and-white films
1930s American films